The Turkish House (also called Turkevi Center) is a 171-metre-high (561 ft), 36-floor skyscraper located at 821 United Nations Plaza in Midtown Manhattan, New York City. Turkish House serves as the headquarters of multiple Turkish diplomatic missions in New York, as well as a center of Turkish cultural activity.

Planning 
102,000 square feet of commercial space is planned on the first 36 floors. The tower has an auditorium and office floors for the UN mission as well as the consulate. Outdoor terrace spaces are located on the 5th, 11th, and 16th floors. Beginning on the 20th floor there are residential spaces for sale and for official use by the Turkish diplomatic missions. The total residential space is estimated to be 40,195 square feet, with each unit averaging about 2,045 square feet. Two duplex apartments are planned. A fitness center, shared terrace space, and a parking garage will be available for residents.

The tower has a view of the Headquarters of the United Nations and the East River.

Turkish President Recep Tayyip Erdoğan formally opened the center on September 20, 2021.

References 

Skyscrapers in New York City